Nikolay Osadchy (born 8 December 1957, Tuapse) is a Russian political figure and a deputy of the 8th State Duma. In 1984, he was granted a Candidate of Sciences degree in philosophy.

Osadchy began his career as a professor of philosophy at Kuban State University. In 1985, he started teaching history, sociology and philosophy at the Kuban State Medical University. In 1988, Osadchy joined the Communist Party of the Soviet Union. In 1995, he became the first secretary of the Krasnodar Krai branch of the Communist Party of the Russian Federation. From 1998 to 2015, he was the deputy of the Legislative Assembly of Krasnodar Krai of the 2nd, 3rd, 4th, and 5th convocations, respectively. In 2016, Osadchy was elected deputy of the 7th State Duma from the Krasnodar Krai convocation. He was re-elected in September 2021 for the 8th State Duma.

References 

 

1957 births
Living people
Communist Party of the Russian Federation members
21st-century Russian politicians
Eighth convocation members of the State Duma (Russian Federation)
Seventh convocation members of the State Duma (Russian Federation)
People from Krasnodar Krai